Patrick Joseph DesRochers (born 27 October 1979) is a Canadian former professional ice hockey goaltender. He played 11 games in the National Hockey League with the Phoenix Coyotes and Carolina Hurricanes between 2001 and 2003. The rest of his career, which lasted from 1999 to 2013, was spent in the minor leagues or in Europe.

Playing career 
He played junior hockey for the Sarnia Sting and Kingston Frontenacs of the Ontario Hockey League.

DesRochers played briefly for both the Phoenix Coyotes and Carolina Hurricanes of the NHL, but spent most of his professional career in the AHL with the Springfield Falcons (for whom he is the career leader among goaltenders in games played), Lowell Lock Monsters and San Antonio Rampage.

DesRochers went to Europe before the 2006-07 season, signing with ETC Crimmitschau. He spent 2007-08 with the Augsburger Panther of the Deutsche Eishockey Liga but became a free agent after the club decided to sign a German goalie. On 12 April 2008, he was presented as the new goaltender of Norwegian team Vålerenga.

Career statistics

Regular season and playoffs

References

External links

1979 births
Living people
Arizona Coyotes draft picks
Augsburger Panther players
Canadian expatriate ice hockey players in Austria
Canadian expatriate ice hockey players in Norway
Canadian expatriate ice hockey players in Germany
Canadian ice hockey goaltenders
Carolina Hurricanes players
ETC Crimmitschau players
Dornbirn Bulldogs players
Franco-Ontarian people
Ice hockey people from Simcoe County
Kingston Frontenacs players
Lowell Lock Monsters players
National Hockey League first-round draft picks
People from Penetanguishene
Phoenix Coyotes players
San Antonio Rampage players
Sarnia Sting players
Springfield Falcons players
Texas Wildcatters players
Vålerenga Ishockey players